The 1904–05 Kansas Jayhawks men's basketball team represented the University of Kansas in its seventh season of collegiate basketball. The head coach was James Naismith, the inventor of the game, who served his 7th year. The Jayhawks finished the season 5–6. Future Jayhawks head coach Phog Allen played for the team.

Roster
Ira Adams
Frank Barlow
Charles Bliss
Forrest Allen
Milton Miller
William Miller
Charles Siler
Roscoe Winnagle

Schedule

References

Kansas Jayhawks men's basketball seasons
Kansas
Kansas
Kansas